Prado Regional Park is a  park in Chino, California within the jurisdiction of San Bernardino County. It offers fishing, archery, camping, a golf course, horseback riding, and a shooting range, which was the site of the 1984 Olympic shooting events.

The park traces its origins to the Santa Ana River floods of 1937 and 1938, which prompted the construction of the Prado Dam in 1939. A state legislative report in 1961 judged that the area around the Prado Dam did "not possess the necessary features or meet the criteria for inclusion in  the State Park System." However, the report recommended a county level administration of a park. In 1972, after community efforts, the State Water Commission approved a $1.3 million grant to help construct a county regional park at the Prado Dam. Prado Park officially opened on July 2, 1976.

References
1984 Summer Olympics official report. Volume 1. Part 1. pp. 87–9.
Prado Regional Park
The Story of Prado Regional Park

Parks in San Bernardino County, California
Chino, California
Golf clubs and courses in California
Regional parks in California
Sports venues in San Bernardino County, California
Sports venues in the Inland Empire
Shooting ranges in the United States
Venues of the 1984 Summer Olympics
Olympic shooting venues